Alexis Christoforous (born October 19, 1970) is a New York-based Correspondent for ABC News. Her reports are featured across the ABC News platform including "ABC News Live", "Good Morning America"," "Nightline", ABC-TV affiliate stations, as well as the ABC Radio Network.

Previously, she worked for Yahoo Finance as an Anchor and Correspondent, interviewing CEOs of Fortune 500 companies and covering major business events including The World Economic Forum in Davos, Switzerland, and the annual meeting of Warren's Buffett's Berkshire Hathaway. 

Prior to Yahoo Finance, she was an Anchor and Correspondent for CBS News where her reports were seen on CBS' "The Early Show", "CBS Evening News Weekend", "CBS News Sunday Morning with Charles Osgood"  "CBS Up to the Minute," "CBS This Morning" as well as over 200 local CBS affiliate stations internationally. Her reports were also heard on the CBS Radio Network and WCBS Newsradio 880.

From 1999–2005 Christoforous was Anchor and Correspondent for CBS Marketwatch where she anchored the nationally syndicated program "MarketWatch Weekend." She was also a fill-in anchor for the local CBS affiliate, WCBS-TV, New York. In addition to her business reporting, Christoforous conducts many entertainment interviews including with Tony Bennett, Madonna, and Ringo Starr.

Her father is Greek-Cypriot and her mother is Italian-American.

Christoforous is a graduate of Fiorello H. LaGuardia High School of Music & Art and Performing Arts where she was a drama major. She graduated cum laude from New York University with a degree in Broadcast Journalism. She lives in New York City with her husband and three children.

Early career

She began her business news career at Bloomberg Television and Radio in 1994, where she anchored the national PBS program "Bloomberg Morning News" and was Bloomberg's first reporter to report live from the floor of the New York Stock Exchange.

Christoforous covered the stock market bull run of the early 1990s and the subsequent Internet bubble burst of 2000. She reported on the economic impact of the September 11, 2001, attacks, the resignation of New York Stock Exchange CEO Richard Grasso and the wave of Wall Street scandals, including Enron, Worldcom and Martha Stewart.

See also
 New Yorkers in journalism

References

External links
Official CBS News Bio
Moneywatch
NEW! Moneywatch.com additional videos
WCBS TV News
CBS Early Show - Morning News
CBS News Sunday Morning
CBS Newspath
CBS Moneywatch

American television journalists
Living people
1971 births
CBS News people